Events from the year 1965 in South Korea.

Incumbents
President: Park Chung-hee 
Prime Minister: Chung Il-kwon

Events

Births
 24 January - Kim Sung-moon, wrestler
 14 August - Moon Kyung-ja.
 25 December - Sung Jung-a.

See also
List of South Korean films of 1965
Years in Japan
Years in North Korea

References

 
South Korea
Years of the 20th century in South Korea
1960s in South Korea
South Korea